Nicholas O'Brien (born 26 June 1993) is a former professional Australian rules footballer who played for the Essendon Football Club in the Australian Football League (AFL). He attended St Patrick's College in Ballarat. In 2011, he captained the St Patrick's schoolboy side to a victory in the MCC Herald Sun Shield He was recruited by Essendon with the 59th overall pick in the 2011 national draft. He made his debut in round 22, 2012, against  at the Melbourne Cricket Ground.

He was delisted by Essendon in November 2015.

In 2016, O'Brien joined Woodville-West Torrens Eagles in the SANFL. http://www.wwtfc.com.au/?page_id=173

References

External links

1993 births
Living people
Essendon Football Club players
Australian rules footballers from Victoria (Australia)
Greater Western Victoria Rebels players
People educated at St Patrick's College, Ballarat
Bendigo Football Club players